Mustafa Yücedağ (25 April 1966 – 17 February 2020) was a Turkish footballer who played as a midfielder.

Career
Born in Gaziantep, Yücedağ moved to the Netherlands with his family at an early age. He played football for Ajax, PEC Zwolle and De Graafschap, as well as in his native Turkey for Sarıyer, Galatasaray, Fenerbahçe and Gaziantepspor.

He also capped nine times for the Turkish national team between 1988 and 1990, including four FIFA World Cup qualifying matches.

After football
On 5 July 2010, Yücedağ was appointed by his former team Galatasaray to act as the assistant coach and interpreter for Frank Rijkaard.

Death
On 17 February 2020, Yücedağ died as a result of heart attack at his home in Zaandam, North Holland.

References

1966 births
2020 deaths
Dutch people of Turkish descent
Turkish footballers
Turkey international footballers
AFC Ajax players
PEC Zwolle players
De Graafschap players
Sarıyer S.K. footballers
Galatasaray S.K. footballers
Fenerbahçe S.K. footballers
Gaziantepspor footballers
Eredivisie players
Eerste Divisie players
Süper Lig players
Turkish expatriate footballers
Expatriate footballers in the Netherlands
Turkish expatriate sportspeople in the Netherlands
Turkey under-21 international footballers
Association football midfielders